Cecilia Arizti Sobrino (28 October 1856 – 30 June 1930) was a Cuban composer, pianist and music educator.

Biography
Cecilia Arizti was born in La Loma del Angel, Havana, the daughter of pianist Fernando Arizti and his wife Teresa Sobrino. Arizti studied music with her father and composition with Francisco Fuentes and Espadero Ruiz, and showed an early talent for composition.

After completing her studies, Arizti performed as a concert pianist in Cuba and the United States. She became a professor at the Conservatory Peyrellade, and published a manual of piano technique.

Works
Arizti's works are for piano and composed in Romantic style.  Selected works include:

Impromptu in F minor
Vals lent
Romanza
Nocturn
Caprici
Reverie, Op. 16
Chamber Trio for piano, violin and cello

References

Further reading 

1856 births
1930 deaths
19th-century classical composers
20th-century classical composers
Cuban people of Basque descent
Cuban classical pianists
Women classical pianists
Cuban women pianists
Cuban composers
Cuban music educators
People from Havana
Piano pedagogues
Women classical composers
Women music educators
Cuban expatriates in the United States
20th-century women composers
19th-century women composers
19th-century women pianists
20th-century women pianists